Wrestling World 2003 was a professional wrestling event held by New Japan Pro-Wrestling (NJPW). The event took place on January 4 in the Tokyo Dome. Wrestling World 2003 was the twelfth January 4 Tokyo Dome Show promoted by NJPW. The show drew 30,000 spectators. The show featured the semi-finals and the finals of the "Young Generation Cup", an NJPW tournament for relative newcomers who have yet to establish themselves as top level wrestlers, which saw Ryushi Yanagisawa defeat Yutaka Yoshie to win the cup. The show featured a total of eleven matches, including a match for the vacant NWF Heavyweight Championship that Yoshihiro Takayama won by defeating Tsuyoshi Kosaka in the finals of a four-man tournament. The main event was a successful defense of the IWGP Heavyweight Championship as champion Yuji Nagata defeated Josh Barnett.

Production

Background
The January 4 Tokyo Dome Show is NJPW's biggest annual event and has been called "the largest professional wrestling show in the world outside of the United States" and the "Japanese equivalent to the Super Bowl".

Storylines
Wrestling World 2003 featured professional wrestling matches that involved different wrestlers from pre-existing scripted feuds and storylines. Wrestlers portrayed villains, heroes, or less distinguishable characters in scripted events that built tension and culminated in a wrestling match or series of matches.

Results

NWF Heavyweight Championship tournament bracket

Young Generation Cup tournament bracket

References

External links
NJPW.co.jp 

2003 in professional wrestling
2003 in Tokyo
January 2003 events in Japan
2003